John Breton may refer to:

John de Breton (died 1275), bishop
John le Breton, MP for Essex in 1290
John Breton (fl. 1328), MP for Wallingford
John Breton I, MP for Bodmin 1380–1384, 1388–1397, Lostwithiel 1384 and 1386
John Breton II, MP for Bodmin in 1386
John Breton (academic) (died 1676), master of Emmanuel College, Cambridge
John Breton (died 1587), MP for Tamworth